The provincial executive (GS) is the executive branch of government of a province in the Netherlands. It is the equivalent of the municipal executive at the provincial level. The provincial executive consists of the King's Commissioner (chair) and three to seven deputies. 

The deputies are chosen by the provincial council, the elected assembly of the province. Each deputy has their own portfolio for which they prepare, coordinate and plan policy and legislation for the provincial council and execute legislation. The deputies have the duty to inform the provincial council on all aspects of their policy. The provincial executive functions as a collegial body and most decisions are taken by consensus.

References

See also
Provincial politics in the Netherlands

Government of the Netherlands
Dutch political institutions
Politics of the Netherlands by province